Martha Namundjebo-Tilahun is a Namibian businesswoman and politician. She is the former president of the Namibia Chamber of Commerce and Industry (NCCI). In 2017 she was a candidate for the position of Deputy Secretary-General of the Swapo Party.

Early life and education
Martha Namundjebo was born in Odibo village in the north of Namibia. She was raised in Olunghono and went to Engela High School. She obtained a BSc degree in Business Administration and Management from Saint Paul's College Lawrenceville, Virginia. Namundjebo further holds an MBA in Finance from the University of California, Berkeley in the United States, and another MBA from Santa Clara University, likewise in California.

Career
After the retirement of Harold Pupkewitz, Namundjebo-Tilahun succeeded him as president of Namibia Chamber of Commerce and Industry (NCCI) in 2010. She held this position until 2014 when Sven Thieme was elected. Namundjebo-Tilahun is also the chairperson of the SADC Chamber of Commerce and sits on the board of several Namibian companies, including Standard Bank Namibia. She owns Namibia's only Five-Star hotel, the Hilton Hotel in Windhoek. In 2021, documents forming part of the Congo Hold-Up revealed financial links between a Namibian fishing company owned by Namundjebo-Tilahun and alleged illicit funds of former DRC president Jospeh Kabila.

Private life
Her husband Haddis Tilahun, is the founder and executive director of the United Africa Group, the company where she serves as chairperson. They have three children.

Awards
 African Business Leader of the Year, 2013, Corporate Council on Africa, Washington, D.C., United States
 Doctor honoris causa in Business Administration, 2015, University of Namibia

References

Year of birth missing (living people)
Living people
People from Ohangwena Region
Namibian women in business
Santa Clara University alumni
Saint Paul's College (Virginia) alumni
University of California, Berkeley alumni
Namibian business executives